The 2018–19 Wisconsin Badgers women's basketball team represented University of Wisconsin at Madison during the 2018–19 NCAA Division I women's basketball season. The Badgers, led by third-year head coach Jonathan Tsipis, played their home games at the Kohl Center as members of the Big Ten Conference. They finished the season 15–18, 4–14 in Big Ten play to finish in 13th place. They advanced to the quarterfinals of the Big Ten women's tournament where they lost to Michigan.

Previous season 
The Badgers finished the 2017–18 season 9–21, including 2–14 in Big Ten play to finish in 13th place. They lost in the first round of the Big Ten women's tournament to Northwestern.

Roster

Recruiting Class

Sources:

Schedule and results

|-
!colspan=9 style= | Exhibition

|-
!colspan=9 style=| Non-conference regular season

|-
!colspan=9 style=| Big Ten regular season

|-
!colspan=9 style=|Big Ten Conference Women's Tournament

Source

See also
2018–19 Wisconsin Badgers men's basketball team

References

Wisconsin Badgers women's basketball seasons
Wisconsin
Wisconsin Badgers women's basketball
Wisconsin Badgers women's basketball